Cesario is both a surname and a given name. Notable people with the name include:

Surname:
 Enzo Cesario (born 1980), Chilean track and road cyclist
 José Cesario Hunter (born 1975), Chilean teacher, singer, biker and songs writer
 Jeff Cesario (born 1953), American comedian and writer
 Juliet Cesario (born 1966), American character actress

Given name:
 Cesario Azucena (21st century), Filipino lawyer
 Cesario Estrada Chavez (1927–1993), American labor leader and civil rights activist.

Fictional characters:
 Cesario (Kiddy Grade), a character in the anime series Kiddy Grade
 Cesario (Viola), a character in the Shakespearean comedy Twelfth Night

Spanish masculine given names